Jase Burgoyne is an Australian rules footballer who plays for the Port Adelaide Football Club in the Australian Football League.

Personal life 
Burgoyne is a third generation player at Port Adelaide with his grandfather Peter Snr playing at the club in 1977. His father Peter Jnr was a premiership player for Port Adelaide in both the SANFL in 1998 and in the AFL in 2004. Burgoyne's uncle Shaun is a four-time AFL premiership player winning with Port Adelaide, alongside Peter Jnr, in 2004 and with Hawthorn in 2013, 2014 and 2015.

External links

Living people
2003 births
Port Adelaide Football Club players
Port Adelaide Football Club players (all competitions)
Australian rules footballers from South Australia